This is a list of philosophical literature articles.

0–9 
101 Philosophy Problems –
16 Questions on the Assassination –
2150 AD –

A 
A Berlin Republic –
A Buyer's Market –
A Calendar of Wisdom –
A Clockwork Orange –
A Conflict of Visions –
A Darwinian Left –
A Defence of Common Sense –
A Defense of Abortion –
A Dissertation on Liberty and Necessity, Pleasure and Pain –
A Few Words on Non-Intervention –
A Fórmula de Deus –
A General View of Positivism –
A Grief Observed –
A Guide for the Perplexed –
A Happy Death –
A History of Money and Banking in the United States –
A History of Murphy's Law –
A History of Philosophy –
A History of Western Philosophy –
A Legend of Old Egypt –
A Letter Concerning Toleration –
A magnanimous act –
A Mathematician's Apology –
A Matter of Life and Death –
A New Era of Thought –
A New Model of the Universe –
A New Philosophy of Society: Assemblage Theory and Social Complexity –
A New Refutation of Time –
A Philosophical Enquiry into the Origin of Our Ideas of the Sublime and Beautiful –
A Philosophical View of Reform –
A Postcognitive Negation –
A Salty Piece of Land –
A Scanner Darkly –
A Short History of Chinese Philosophy –
A System of Logic –
A Theory of Justice –
A Thousand Plateaus –
A Treatise Concerning the Principles of Human Knowledge –
A Treatise of Human Nature –
A Treatise of Human Nature –
A Vindication of the Rights of Men –
A Voyage to Arcturus –
A Week on the Concord and Merrimack Rivers –
Abstracta –
Achieving Our Country –
ACPI Encyclopedia of Philosophy –
Acta Philosophica Fennica –
Acting Out –
Action Philosophers! –
Acts of Literature –
Actuel Marx –
Adam Zachary Newton –
Adoro te devote –
Adventures In Legal Land –
Adventures In Legal Land-
Adventures of Wim –
Aenesidemus –
Aesthetic of Ugliness –
Aesthetic Theory –
After Many a Summer –
After Virtue –
Against Method –
Against the Sophists –
Agalma –
Agap  Agape –
Agni Yoga –
Alciphron –
Alexander Hamilton –
Alfred Schmidt bibliography –
Aline and Valcour –
All and Everything –
All That Is Solid Melts into Air –
All Truth Is God's Truth –
America at the Crossroads –
America's Great Depression –
American Catholic Philosophical Quarterly –
American Journal of Bioethics –
American Philosophical Quarterly –
Amerika –
Amnesia –
An Attempt at a Critique of All Revelation –
An Austrian Perspective on the History of Economic Thought –
An Enquiry Concerning Human Understanding –
An Enquiry Concerning the Principles of Morals –
An Essay Concerning Human Understanding –
An Essay on the History of Civil Society –
An Essay towards a Real Character and a Philosophical Language –
An Honest Thief –
An Imaginative Approach to Teaching –
An Intelligent Person's Guide to Atheism –
An Introduction to Zen Buddhism –
An Occurrence at Owl Creek Bridge –
An Open Heart –
Analects –
Análisis Filosófico –
Analysis –
Anarchist Encyclopedia –
Anarcho-capitalist literature –
Anarchy, State, and Utopia –
Ancient Philosophy –
Ancient Wisdom, Modern World –
And the Ass Saw the Angel –
Angelaki –
Angeli –
Animal Liberation –
Animals in Translation –
Animus –
Answer to Job –
Anthem –
Anti-Dühring –
Anti-Federalist Papers –
Anti-Oedipus –
Anti-Œdipus –
Anti-Semite and Jew –
Antidosis –
Antigone –
Anuario Filosófico –
Aparoksanubhuti –
Apeiron –
Apology –
Apology –
Arabic Sciences and Philosophy –
Arcadia –
Archiv für Begriffsgeschichte –
Archiv für Geschichte der Philosophie –
Archiv für Rechts- und Sozialphilosophie –
Archive Fever –
Archive for Mathematical Logic –
Areopagitica –
Aristotle for Everybody –
Ars Disputandi –
Art as Experience –
As a Man Thinketh –
As I Lay Dying –
Atheism Conquered –
Atheist Delusions –
Atlas Shrugged –
Attacking Faulty Reasoning –
Attempt at a Critique of All Revelation –
Augustenburger Briefe –
Augustinian Studies –
Aurea Catena Homeri –
Australasian Journal of Philosophy –
Axiochus –
Ayn Rand: The Russian Radical –

B 

Bandagi Nama –
Bantu Philosophy –
Beelzebub's Tales to His Grandson –
Begriffsschrift –
Behemoth –
Behind the Mirror: A Search for a Natural History of Human Knowledge –
Being and Nothingness –
Being and Time –
Belmont Report –
Berkeley Studies –
Between Facts and Norms –
Between Heaven and Hell –
Between Past and Future –
Betwixt and Between –
Beyond Freedom and Dignity –
Beyond Good and Evil –
Bierville Elegies –
Bioethics –
Biographia Literaria –
Black-Body Theory and the Quantum Discontinuity –
Blackwell Companion to Philosophy –
Blade Runner –
Blue and Brown Books –
Book of Exodus –
Boston Collaborative Encyclopedia of Western Theology –
Boston Monthly Magazine –
Bowling Green Studies in Applied Philosophy –
Brainstorms –
Breakfast with Buddha –
Breaking the Spell: Religion as a Natural Phenomenon –
British Journal for the History of Philosophy –
British Journal for the Philosophy of Science –
British Journal of Aesthetics –
Broadway Barks –
Brother Wolf –
Business and Professional Ethics Journal –
Business and Society Review –
Business Ethics Quarterly –

C 
Cahiers pour l'Analyse –
Cambridge Quarterly of Healthcare Ethics –
Canadian Journal of Philosophy –
Candide –
Capitalism and Schizophrenia –
Cartesian Meditations –
Cartesian Reflections –
Casual peeps at Sophia –
Cat's Cradle –
Catching the Big Fish –
Categories –
Cato Maior de Senectute –
Causal Theory of Knowing –
Charles Sanders Peirce bibliography –
Charles W. Morris bibliography –
Charmides –
Child of God –
Chitralekha –
Chovot HaLevavot –
Christian Discourses –
Cinema 1: The Movement Image –
Clitophon –
Codex Ambrosianus 435 –
Codex Coislinianus 386 –
Codex Marcianus CCXXVIII –
Codex Vaticanus 1026 –
Codex Vaticanus 1339 –
Codex Vaticanus 253 –
Codex Vaticanus 260 –
Codex Vaticanus 266 –
Codex Vindobonensis Philos. 157 –
Codex Vindobonensis Philos. 2 –
Codex Vindobonensis Philos. 75 –
Collapse –
Collected Works of Sri Aurobindo –
Commentaries on Living –
Compensation –
Conceived in Liberty –
Concluding Unscientific Postscript to Philosophical Fragments –
Confessions –
Configurations –
Conjectures and Refutations –
Conócete a ti mismo –
Consciousness Explained –
Considerations on Representative Government –
Considerations on the Government of Poland –
Consolatio –
Consolation of Philosophy –
Constitution of the Athenians –
Constructivist Foundations –
Contemporary Pragmatism –
Continent magazine –
Contingency, Irony, and Solidarity –
Contra Errores Graecorum –
Contributions to Philosophy –
Convergence –
Corpus Aristotelicum –
Cratylus –
Creative Evolution –
Crime and Punishment –
Critias –
Critique of Cynical Reason –
Critique of Dialectical Reason –
Critique of Hegel's Philosophy of Right –
Critique of Judgement –
Critique of Judgment –
Critique of Practical Reason –
Critique of Pure Reason –
Crito –
Croatian Journal of Philosophy –
Crooked Timber –
Crowds and Power –
Culture and Value –
Culture Industry Reconsidered –
Cyphernomicon –

D 
Darwin's Dangerous Idea –
Das Argument –
Das Kapital –
Das Siegesfest –
Das verschleierte Bild zu Sais –
Dawkins vs. Gould –
De Arte Combinatoria –
De Brevitate Vitae –
De Cive –
De Corpore –
De Divinatione –
De Docta Ignorantia –
De finibus bonorum et malorum –
De Interpretatione –
De Legibus –
De libero arbitrio –
De libero arbitrio diatribe sive collatio –
De Monarchia –
De Motu –
De Mysteriis Aegyptiorum –
De Natura Deorum –
De Officiis –
De Providentia –
De re publica –
De rerum natura –
De spectaculis –
De Veritate –
De Vita Beata –
De vita libri tres –
De vita solitaria –
Death in Venice –
Death into Life –
Death, Desire and Loss in Western Culture –
Defensor pacis –
Definitions –
Deleuze Studies –
Delirium –
Demetrius –
Demodocus –
Demons –
Der Antritt des neuen Jahrhunderts –
Der Gang nach dem Eisenhammer –
Der Handschuh –
Der Kampf mit dem Drachen –
Der Mensch und die Technik –
Der Ring des Polykrates –
Der Taucher –
Derech Hashem –
Derrida Today –
Destiny, or The Attraction of Affinities –
Deutsche Zeitschrift für Philosophie –
Dhammapada –
Dhammapada –
Dialectic of Enlightenment –
Dialectica –
Dialectical and Historical Materialism –
Dialogue Concerning the Two Chief World Systems –
Dialogues Concerning Natural Religion –
Dictes and Sayings of the Philosophers –
Dictionnaire Historique et Critique –
Dictionnaire philosophique –
Die Bürgschaft –
Die Götter Griechenlandes –
Die Horen –
Die Huldigung der Künste –
Die Kraniche des Ibykus –
Difference and Repetition –
Dilemata –
Diogenes –
Diogenes and Alexander –
Dionysius –
Directory of American Philosophers –
Dirty Hands –
Discipline and Punish –
Discourse on Inequality –
Discourse on Metaphysics –
Discourse on the Arts and Sciences –
Discourse on the Method –
Disquisitions relating to Matter and Spirit –
Dissoi logoi –
Do Androids Dream of Electric Sheep? –
Dogfall –
Dokk d –
Don Carlos –
Donnie Darko –
Down the River –
Doxography –
Dream Children –
Duties Beyond Borders –

E 
Ecce Homo –
Ecclesiastes of Erasmus –
Echographies of Television –
Economic and Philosophical Manuscripts of 1844 –
Economics –
Edifying Discourses in Diverse Spirits –
Edward Said bibliography –
Efrydiau Athronyddol –
Egalitarianism as a Revolt Against Nature and Other Essays –
Either/Or –
El Túnel –
Elbow Room –
Elements of the Philosophy of Right –
Emunoth ve-Deoth –
Encyclopedia of Aesthetics –
Encyclopedia of Philosophy –
Encyclopedia of the Philosophical Sciences –
Encyclopédie –
End the Fed –
Ending Aging –
English, August –
Enneads –
Enron Code of Ethics –
Environmental Ethics –
Environmental Philosophy –
Epicurea –
Epigrams –
Epinomis –
Episodes of the Cuban Revolutionary War –
Epistemologia –
Epistle to Yemen –
Epistles –
Epistles of Wisdom –
Erewhon Revisited –
Erkenntnis –
Eryxias –
Essay on the Origin of Languages –
Essays –
Essays –
Essays and Aphorisms on the Higher Man –
Essays in Radical Empiricism –
Essays in the Philosophy of Humanism –
Essays on Philosophical Subjects –
Essays on Some Unsettled Questions of Political Economy –
Essays, Moral, Political, and Literary –
Ethica thomistica –
Ethical Consumer –
Ethical Theory and Moral Practice –
Ethical will –
Ethics –
Ethics (Spinoza) –
Ethics & International Affairs –
Ethics and Language –
Ethics, Institutions, and the Right to Philosophy –
Ethics: Inventing Right and Wrong –Études Phénoménologiques –Eudemian Ethics –Euro-Sinica –European Journal of Philosophy –European Journal of Political Theory –Euthydemus –Euthyphro –Excision –Exile and the Kingdom –Existenz –Experiments in Ethics –Exploits and Opinions of Dr. Faustroll, pataphysician –Exploring Reality –Explosion in a Cathedral –

 F Fact, Fiction, and Forecast –Factor T –Fahrenheit 451 –Faith and Philosophy –Falsafatuna –Famine, Affluence, and Morality –Fascist manifesto –Fatemeh Is Fatemeh –Fathers and Sons –Fear and Trembling –Federalist No. 1 –Federalist No. 2 –Federalist No. 3 –Federalist No. 4 –Federalist No. 5 –Federalist No. 6 –Federalist No. 7 –Federalist No. 8 –Federalist No. 9 –Federalist No. 10 –Federalist No. 11 –Federalist No. 12 –Federalist No. 13 –Federalist No. 14 –Federalist No. 15 –Federalist No. 16 –Federalist No. 17 –Federalist No. 18 –Federalist No. 19 –Federalist No. 20 –Federalist No. 21 –Federalist No. 22 –Federalist No. 23 –Federalist No. 24 –Federalist No. 25 –Federalist No. 26 –Federalist No. 27 –Federalist No. 28 –Federalist No. 29 –Federalist No. 30 –Federalist No. 31 –Federalist No. 32 –Federalist No. 33 –Federalist No. 34 –Federalist No. 35 –Federalist No. 36 –Federalist No. 37 –Federalist No. 38 –Federalist No. 39 –Federalist No. 40 –Federalist No. 41 –Federalist No. 42 –Federalist No. 43 –Federalist No. 44 –Federalist No. 45 –Federalist No. 46 –Federalist No. 47 –Federalist No. 48 –Federalist No. 49 –Federalist No. 50 –Federalist No. 51 –Federalist No. 52 –Federalist No. 53 –Federalist No. 54 –Federalist No. 55 –Federalist No. 56 –Federalist No. 57 –Federalist No. 58 –Federalist No. 59 –Federalist No. 60 –Federalist No. 61 –Federalist No. 62 –Federalist No. 63 –Federalist No. 64 –Federalist No. 65 –Federalist No. 66 –Federalist No. 67 –Federalist No. 68 –Federalist No. 69 –Federalist No. 70 –Federalist No. 71 –Federalist No. 72 –Federalist No. 73 –Federalist No. 74 –Federalist No. 75 –Federalist No. 76 –Federalist No. 77 –Federalist No. 78 –Federalist No. 79 –Federalist No. 80 –Federalist No. 81 –Federalist No. 82 –Federalist No. 83 –Federalist No. 84 –Federalist No. 85 –Federalist Papers –Fenomenologia dell'Individuo Assoluto –Fields of Force –Fiesco –Fifth Letter –Filosofick asopis –Filozofia –First Alcibiades –First Letter –First Things First 1964 manifesto –First Things First 2000 manifesto –Florida Philosophical Review –Flow My Tears, the Policeman Said –Fooled by Randomness –For a New Critique of Political Economy –For a New Liberty –For Self-Examination –For the New Intellectual –Forces and Fields –Foro Interno. Anuario de Teoría Política –Foundations of Christianity –Foundations of Natural Right –Foundations of Science –Four Dissertations –Four Upbuilding Discourses, 1843 –Fourth Way –Freedom and Culture –Freedom and the Law –Freedom Evolves –Freedom from the Known –Friday, or, The Other Island –Friedrich Hayek bibliography –Friedrich Nietzsche bibliography –Friends, Lovers, Chocolate –From Bakunin to Lacan –Function and Concept –Fundamentals of Marxism–Leninism –Futurist Manifesto –

 G Gabriel's Wing –Gaudy Night –Generation of Animals –Georg Wilhelm Friedrich Hegel bibliography –George Steiner bibliography –Germinal –Gertrud –Get Stupid! –Getting it Wrong from the Beginning –Gift from Hijaz –Giordano Bruno and the Hermetic Tradition –Glas –Gli Asolani –God & Golem, Inc. –God and Other Minds –God and the State –God Is Not Great –God, A Guide for the Perplexed –God, No! Signs You May Already Be An Atheist and Other Magical Tales –Gödel, Escher, Bach –Godspeed –Gojiro –Gorgias –Graduate Faculty Philosophy Journal –Grammar of Assent –Great Learning –Groundwork of the Metaphysic of Morals –Grundlagen der Mathematik –Grundrisse –Guanzi –Guardians of Being –Gulliver's Travels –Gulshan-i Raz-i Jadid –

 H Hagakure –Halcyon –Handbook of Automated Reasoning –Harry Stottlemeier's Discovery –Hastings Center Report –Hatata –Have a Little Faith –Hayom Yom –Hayy ibn Yaqdhan –Heart of Darkness –Heaven and Hell –Hegemony and Socialist Strategy –Heidegger Gesamtausgabe –Heidegger Studies –Help Yourself –Hermocrates –Hermsprong –Hiero –Hipparchus –Hippias Major –Hippias Minor –His Master's Voice –Histoire secrete d'Isabelle de Baviere, reine de France –Histories and Addresses of Philosophical Societies –Historisch-kritisches Wörterbuch des Marxismus –History and Class Consciousness –History and Future of Justice –History of Animals –History of Materialism and Critique of its Present Importance –History of Political Philosophy –Hölderlin's Hymn "The Ister" –Holy History of Mankind –Hominid –Hortensius –How Are We to Live? –How to See Yourself As You Really Are –Huangdi Sijing –Huangdi Yinfujing –Huashu –Human Affairs –Human Technology –Human, All Too Human –Humana.Mente – Journal of Philosophical Studies –Hume Studies –Husserliana –Hydriotaphia, Urn Burial –

 I I Am a Strange Loop –I and Thou –I Hope I Shall Arrive Soon –I problemi della guerra e le vie della pace –I Sold My Soul on eBay –Ibn Hazm bibliography –Idea for a Universal History with a Cosmopolitan Purpose –Idealistic Studies –Idou o anthropos –Illusion and Reality –Illusions –Ilm Al-Iqtisad –Imaginary Conversations –Imperium: The Philosophy of History and Politics –In a Different Voice –In Defense of Anarchism –In Praise of Idleness and Other Essays –In Search of Lost Time –In Search of the Miraculous –In the Labyrinth –In the Valley of the Kings –Individualism and Economic Order –Individualism Old and New –Inequality Reexamined –Informal Logic –Inne pie ni –Insinger Papyrus –Intellectuals and Society –Intelligent Thought –Intensive Science and Virtual Philosophy –Intentional Logic –International Directory of Philosophy and Philosophers –International Directory of Philosophy –International Journal of Applied Philosophy –International Journal of Baudrillard Studies –International Journal of Philosophical Studies –International Journal of the Asian Philosophical Association –International Journal of i ek Studies –International Philosophical Quarterly –International Studies in Philosophy –Internet Encyclopedia of Philosophy –Intrigue and Love –Introduction to Kant's Anthropology –Introduction to Mathematical Philosophy –Introduction to Metaphysics –Introduction to Metaphysics –Introduction to Objectivist Epistemology –Invariances –Invisible Man –Ion –Irrational Man: A Study in Existential Philosophy –Is God Dead? –Is logic empirical? –Isagoge –Ishmael –Iyyun –

 J Jacques Derrida bibliography –Jacques the Fatalist –James Madison –Janus: A Summing Up –Javid Nama –Jerusalem –John Dewey bibliography –Jordens Herrar –Journal for General Philosophy of Science –Journal for Peace and Justice Studies –Journal of Applied Non-Classical Logics –Journal of Applied Philosophy –Journal of Automated Reasoning –Journal of Business Ethics Education –Journal of Business Ethics –Journal of Empirical Research on Human Research Ethics –Journal of Ethics & Social Philosophy –Journal of Indian Philosophy –Journal of Information Ethics –Journal of Logic and Computation –Journal of Logic, Language and Information –Journal of Lutheran Ethics –Journal of Mathematical Logic –Journal of Medical Ethics –Journal of Mind and Behavior –Journal of Moral Philosophy –Journal of Nietzsche Studies –Journal of Philosophical Logic –Journal of Philosophical Research –Journal of Scottish Philosophy –Journal of Speculative Philosophy –Journal of Symbolic Logic –Journal of the History of Ideas –Journal of the History of Philosophy –Journal of Value Inquiry –Journal on African Philosophy –Journals of Ayn Rand –Journey to the End of the Whale –Judge for Yourselves! –Julian and Maddalo –Julie, or the New Heloise –Juliette –Jürgen Habermas bibliography –Just a Couple of Days –Just and Unjust Wars –Justice as Fairness: A Restatement –Justine –

 K Kallias-Briefe –Kant-Studien –Kantian Review –Kav ha-Yashar –Kennedy Institute of Ethics Journal –Kennisbank Filosofie Nederland –Key Ideas in Human Thought –Khizr-i-Rah –Kiss Me, Judas –Kit b al-Hayaw n –Knowing and the Known –Knowledge and Its Limits –Knowledge of Angels –Kol HaTor –Krishnamurti to Himself –Krishnamurti's Journal –Krishnamurti's Notebook –Kritike –Kuzari –

 L L'Arco e la Clava –L'existentialisme est un humanisme –L'expérience intérieure –La Géométrie –La Part maudite –La Peau de chagrin –Laches –Laelius de Amicitia –Language As Symbolic Action –Language, Truth, and Logic –Languages of Art –Lauda Sion –Laws –Le devin du village –Le Monde's 100 Books of the Century –Le Ton beau de Marot –Lectures and Conversations on Aesthetics, Psychology, and Religious Belief –Lectures on Aesthetics –Lectures on Jurisprudence –Lectures on the History of Philosophy –Lectures on the Philosophy of History –Lectures on the Philosophy of Religion –Left Wing Manifesto –Legitimation Crisis –Leibniz–Clarke correspondence –Leo Tolstoy bibliography –Les Temps modernes –Les Thanatonautes –Letter to a Christian Nation –Letter to M. D'Alembert on Spectacles –Letters of Ayn Rand –Letters to a Philosophical Unbeliever –Letters to a Young Contrarian –Lettre sur les aveugles à l'usage de ceux qui voient –Leviathan –Leviathan and the Air-Pump –Lex, Rex –Liberty Defined –Library of Living Philosophers –Liezi –Life Is Real Only Then, When 'I Am' –Life of Castruccio Castracani –Life of Jesus –Life of Pi –Likkutei Sichos –Limited Inc –Linacre Quarterly –Linguistic and Philosophical Investigations –Linguistics and Philosophy –List of books about philosophy –List of books about the Romanian Revolution of 1989 –List of Federalist Papers –List of important publications in philosophy –List of logic journals –List of philosophy journals –List of rasa'il in the Encyclopedia of the Brethren of Purity –List of works by Joseph Priestley –List of works in critical theory –Listen, Anarchist! –Lives and Opinions of Eminent Philosophers –Living Ethics –Logic as a Positive Science –Logic Made Easy –Logica Universalis –Logical Analysis and History of Philosophy –Logical Methods in Computer Science –Logicomix –Longinus –Loss and Gain –Lothair –Lunheng –Lysis –

 M Mad pain and Martian pain –Madness and Civilization –Magna Moralia –Maieutics –Man and Technics –Man, Economy, and State –Man's Search for Meaning –Marius the Epicurean –Marquis de Sade bibliography –Marshall McLuhan bibliography –Mary Stuart –Matter and Memory –Max Weber bibliography –May 68, Philosophy is in the Street! –Meaning and Purpose –Mechanics –Mediations –Meditations on First Philosophy –Meditations on the Peaks –Meetings with Remarkable Men –Memoirs of Emma Courtney –Memoirs of Modern Philosophers –Memorabilia –Men Among the Ruins –Mencius –Menexenus –Meno's slave –Meno –Mens Sana Monographs –Mesillat Yesharim –Message from the East –Metamagical Themas –Metaphysical Foundations of Natural Science –Metaphysics –Metaphysics of Morals –Meteorology –Michel Foucault bibliography –Midwest Studies in Philosophy –Might Is Right –Mind –Mind & Language –Minds and Machines –Minds, Machines and Gödel –Minima Moralia –Minos –Miscellanea Logica –Mivchar Hapeninim –Modern Moral Philosophy –Modern Physics and Ancient Faith –Mold of the Earth –Molly's Shoes –Monadology –Moral Minds –Morals by Agreement –Movement of Animals –Muhammad Iqbal bibliography –Muirhead Library of Philosophy –Multitudes (journal) –Musaeum Hermeticum –Mutual Aid: A Factor of Evolution –My Philosophical Development –My Sister and I –Myths to Live By –

 N Naïve. Super –Naming and Necessity –Narrative Inquiry in Bioethics –Natural Ontological Attitude –Natural Supernaturalism –Nature –Nausea –Negative Dialectics –Neither Victims Nor Executioners –New Atlantis –New Essays on Human Understanding –New Libertarian Manifesto –New Vico Studies –Niccolo's Smile –Nicomachean Ethics –Nietzsche and Philosophy –Nietzsche contra Wagner –Night Train to Lisbon –Ninth Bridgewater Treatise –Ninth Letter –No Exit –
Noam Chomsky bibliography –Noesis –Nordic Journal of Philosophical Logic –Nos, Book of the Resurrection –Not by Bread Alone –Notes from Underground –Notes on "Camp" –Notre Dame Journal of Law, Ethics & Public Policy –Noûs –Novum Organum –Now and After –

 O O Sacrum Convivium –Objectivism: The Philosophy of Ayn Rand –Observations on Man –Observations on the Feeling of the Beautiful and Sublime –Ode to Joy –Oeconomicus –Of Grammatology –Of Miracles –Of the Conduct of the Understanding –Off-modern –Old Times –On Ayn Rand –On Being a Pagan –On Breath –On Bullshit –On Certainty –On Colors –On Denoting –On Disobedience and other essays –On Divination in Sleep –On Dreams –On Generation and Corruption –On Grace and Dignity –On Ideas –On Indivisible Lines –On Justice –On Length and Shortness of Life –On Liberty –On Marvellous Things Heard –On Melissus, Xenophanes, and Gorgias –On Memory –On Naïve and Sentimental Poetry –On Nature –On Nature –On Nature –On Plants –On Sleep –On Social Freedom –On the Aesthetic Education of Man –On the Basis of Morality –On the Bondage of the Will –On the Concept of Irony with Continual Reference to Socrates –On the Fourfold Root of the Principle of Sufficient Reason –On the Freedom of the Will –On the Genealogy of Morality –On the Heavens –On the Plurality of Worlds –On the Soul –On the Universe –On Things Heard –On Truth and Lies in a Nonmoral Sense –On Truth –On Virtue –On Virtues and Vices –On Vision and Colors –On Youth, Old Age, Life and Death, and Respiration –Opus Majus –Or Adonai –Oration on the Dignity of Man –Orchot Tzaddikim –Organon F –Organon –Orientalism –Our Posthuman Future –

 P Pacific Philosophical Quarterly –Pange Lingua Gloriosi Corporis Mysterium –Papa Sartre –Papyrus Oxyrhynchus 23 –Papyrus Oxyrhynchus 24 –Parerga and Paralipomena –Parmenides –Parts of Animals –Parva Naturalia –Passage –Passing Strange –Passions of the Soul –Patrick Laude –Pensées –Perpetual peace –Persecution and the Art of Writing –Persian Letters –Persian Psalms –Phaedo –Phaedrus –Phenomenology of Perception –Philebus –Philo –Philo's Works –Philosophers' Imprint –Philosophia Africana –Philosophia Mathematica –Philosophia Reformata –Philosophical Explanations –Philosophical Explorations –Philosophical fiction –Philosophical Fragments –Philosophical Gourmet Report –Philosophical Inquiries into the Essence of Human Freedom –Philosophical Inquiry –Philosophical Investigations –Philosophical Investigations –Philosophical Issues –Philosophical Notebooks –Philosophical Papers –Philosophical Perspectives –Philosophical Psychology –Philosophical Studies –Philosophical Topics –Philosophical Writings –Philosophy –Philosophy & Rhetoric –Philosophy & Social Criticism –Philosophy and literature –Philosophy and Phenomenological Research –Philosophy and Public Affairs –Philosophy and Real Politics –Philosophy and Social Hope –Philosophy and the Mirror of Nature –Philosophy and Theology –Philosophy as Cultural Politics –Philosophy Documentation Center eCollection –Philosophy Documentation Center –Philosophy East and West –Philosophy encyclopedia –Philosophy in a New Key –Philosophy in the Bedroom –Philosophy in the Tragic Age of the Greeks –Philosophy Now –Philosophy of Arithmetic –Philosophy of Existence –Philosophy of Freedom –Philosophy of Mathematics Education Journal –Philosophy of Science –Philosophy Pathways –Philosophy Research Index –Philosophy, Psychiatry, & Psychology –Philosophy: The Quest for Truth –PhilPapers –Phineas Poe –Physicist and Christian –Physics –Physiognomonics –Pictures from the Water Trade –Pincher Martin –Pink –Pippin –Plato and a Platypus Walk Into a Bar –Pli –Poetics –Policraticus –Polish Logic –Political Liberalism –Political Order in Changing Societies –Politics –Politics Drawn from the Very Words of Holy Scripture –Politics, Philosophy & Economics –Pooh and the Philosophers –Popper and After –Positions –Posterior Analytics –Postmodernism, or, the Cultural Logic of Late Capitalism –Power and Market –Power: A New Social Analysis –Practical Ethics –Practice in Christianity –Praxis Journal of Philosophy –Prefaces –Principia Ethica –Principia Mathematica –Principia philosophiae cartesianae –Principles of Mathematical Logic –Principles of Philosophy –Principles of Political Economy –Principles of Psychology –Prior Analytics –Prison Notebooks –Problems –Problems of Peace and Socialism –Proceedings of the American Catholic Philosophical Association –Proceedings of the American Philosophical Society –Process and Reality –Professional Ethics –Progression of Animals –Prolegomena to Any Future Metaphysics –Proofs and Refutations –Proslogion –Protagoras –Protrepticus –Przegl d Tomistyczny –Psychoanalysis and Religion –Public Understanding of Science –Punishment and Social Structure –Pygmalion –

 Q Qingjing Jing –Quest –Quinque viae –Quodlibet –

 R Radical Evolution –Radical Philosophy Review –Radical Philosophy –Rameau's Nephew –Ratio –Re.press –Reading Capital –Reason and Revolution –Reasons and Persons –Recherches husserliennes –Reflections on the Guillotine –Reflections on the Revolution in France –Reflexe –Refus Global –Religio Medici –Religion within the Bounds of Bare Reason –Religious Studies –Remarks on the Foundations of Mathematics –Repertorium der Nederlandse Wijsbegeerte –Repetition –Replay –Report on the Construction of Situations –Representative Men –Resignation –Resistance, Rebellion, and Death –Reveries of a Solitary Walker –Review of Metaphysics –Review of Philosophy and Psychology –Revista Ideas y Valores –Revolt Against the Modern World –Revolution from above –Revolutions in Mathematics –Revue de métaphysique et de morale –Revue de synthèse –Revue philosophique de la France et de l'étranger –Revue Philosophique de Louvain –Rhetoric –Rhetoric to Alexander –Rhythmanalysis –Richard Jefferies –Ride the Tiger –Right to Philosophy –Rights of Man –Ritter Toggenburg –Rival Lovers –Robert Elsmere –Roger Scruton bibliography –Rosencrantz and Guildenstern Are Dead –Routledge Encyclopedia of Philosophy –Rules for the Direction of the Mind –Russell Kirk bibliography –Russell–Einstein Manifesto –

 S Saare Jahan Se Achcha –Sacris solemniis –Safina-yi Tabriz –Saint Genet –Saints and Revolutionaries –Salomon's House –Samayas ra –Sartor Resartus –Sartre Studies International –Scepticism and Animal Faith –Schottenstein Edition of the Babylonian Talmud –Science of Logic –Science of man –Science, Order, and Creativity –Search for a Method –Second Alcibiades –Second Letter –Sefer ha-Ikkarim –Sefer ha-Qabbalah –Self-Constitution –Sense and Sensibilia –Sense and Sensibilia –Seven Life Lessons of Chaos –Seventh Letter –Sex, Ecology, Spirituality –Sex, Sin, and Zen –Sexual Morality and the Law –Shades –Shem Mishmuel –Siddhartha –Simulacra and Simulation –Sincerity and Authenticity –Sisyphus –Six lectures about loneliness –Six Myths about the Good Life –Siyasatnama –Sketch for a Historical Picture of the Progress of the Human Mind –Sketch for a Theory of the Emotions –Slaughterhouse-Five –Slavoj  i ek bibliography –Slovenska smer –Slowness –Small Pieces Loosely Joined –Social Epistemology –Social Justice in the Liberal State –Social Philosophy Today –Social Studies of Science –Social Theory and Practice –Socialist Thought and Practice –Society of Mind –Socratic dialogue –Socratic Puzzles –Some Remarks on Logical Form –Some Thoughts Concerning Education –Somnium Scipionis –Song of the Bell –Sophia –Sophie's World –Sophist –Sophistical Refutations –Søren Kierkegaard bibliography –Sorites –South Park and Philosophy: Bigger, Longer, and More Penetrating –South Park and Philosophy: You Know, I Learned Something Today –Southern Journal of Philosophy –Soviet Orientalist studies in Islam –Specters of Marx –Speech and Phenomena –Spheres of Justice –Spinoza: Practical Philosophy –Spiritual Heritage of India –Stages on Life's Way –Stanford Encyclopedia of Philosophy –States and Social Revolutions –Statesman –Statism and Anarchy –Steppenwolf –Stoicorum Veterum Fragmenta –Straight and Crooked Thinking –Strange Life of Ivan Osokin –Stranger in a Strange Land –Straw Dogs: Thoughts on Humans and Other Animals –Striking at the Roots –Studia Logica –Studia Neoaristotelica –Studia Phaenomenologica –Studies in Christian Ethics –Studies in Ethics, Law and Technology –Studies in Logic, Grammar and Rhetoric –Successions of Philosophers –Sum of Logic –Summa contra Gentiles –Summa Theologica –Supplément au voyage de Bougainville –Surrealist Manifesto –Symposium –Symposium –Synthese –Systems of Survival –

 T Taking Rights Seriously –Taledanda –Tancred –Tanya –Tao of Jeet Kune Do –Tao Te Ching –Tarana-e-Milli –Teaching Ethics –Teaching Philosophy –Technics and Time, 1 –Technoromanticism –Telos –Tenth Letter –Teorema –Teoria dell'Individuo Assoluto –Thalia –The 120 Days of Sodom –The Abolition of Work –The Absence of the Book –The Acorn –The Adulterous Woman –The Advancement of Learning –The Adventures of Jonathan Gullible –The Age of Reason –The Alphabet Versus the Goddess: The Conflict Between Word and Image –The American Journal of Semiotics –The Analysis of Beauty –The Analyst –The Anatomy Lesson –The Anatomy of Revolution –The Antichrist –The Archaeology of Knowledge –The Aristos –The Art of Being Right –The Art of Happiness –The Art of Loving –The Art of Worldly Wisdom –The Artist at Work –The Atheist's Guide to Christmas –The Athenian Murders –The Authoritarian Personality –The Autobiography of an Ex-Colored Man –'''The Ayn Rand Lexicon –
The Bar Code Rebellion –
The Bar Code Tattoo –
The Beginning of Infinity –
The Betrayal of the American Right –
The Birth of the Clinic –
The Birth of Tragedy –
The Black Swan –
The Blood of Others –
The Book of Lord Shang –
The Book of Mirdad –
The Book of Opposites –
The Book of Tea –
The Book of the Apple –
The Book on Adler –
The Bounds of Sense –
The Bride of Messina –
The Brothers Karamazov –
The Call of the Marching Bell –
The Cambridge Dictionary of Philosophy –
The Cambridge Quintet –
The Case Against the Fed –
The Case for God –
The Case of Thomas N. –
The Case of Wagner –
The Castle –
The Century –
The Chips Are Down –
The Choice –
The Closing of the American Mind –
The Closing of the Western Mind –
The Cloud of Unknowing –
The Clouds –
The Commonwealth of Oceana –
The Communist Manifesto –
The Concept of Anxiety –
The Concept of Law –
The Concept of Mind –
The Concept of the Political –
The Condemned of Altona –
The Conditions of Philosophy –
The Conquest of Bread –
The Conscious Mind –
The Consolations of Philosophy –
The Continuing Revolution –
The Contortionist's Handbook –
The Course in Positive Philosophy –
The Cream of the Jest –
The Criminal of Lost Honour –
The Crisis and a Crisis in the Life of an Actress –
The Critic as Artist –
The Crock of Gold –
The Crucible –
The Dawkins Delusion? –
The Dawn –
The Death of Bunny Munro –
The Death of Postmodernism and Beyond –
The Death of Virgil –
The Death of Vishnu –
The Decadence of Industrial Democracies –
The Description of the Human Body –
The Development of Capitalism in Russia –
The Development of Metaphysics in Persia –
The Devil and the Good Lord –
The Dictionary of Fashionable Nonsense –
The Difference Between Fichte's and Schelling's Systems of Philosophy –
The Difference Between the Democritean and Epicurean Philosophy of Nature –
The Doctrine of Fascism –
The Doctrine of Philosophical Necessity Illustrated –
The Doomed City –
The Doors of Perception –
The Earth House –
The Economics and Ethics of Private Property –
The Educated Mind –
The Ego and Its Own –
The Elegance of the Hedgehog –
The Elements of Moral Philosophy –
The Elements of Racial Education –
The Emperor's New Mind –
The End of Faith –
The End of History and the Last Man –
The End of the Soul –
The Essence of Christianity –
The Ethical Slut –
The Ethics of Ambiguity –
The Ethics of Liberty –
The Evolution of Physics –
The Examined Life –
The Extended Mind –
The Fall –
The False Subtlety of the Four Syllogistic Figures –
The Feast of Fools –
The First and Last Freedom –
The First Man –
The Flies –
The Flight from Woman –
The Foundations of Arithmetic –
The Fountainhead –
The Fragility of Goodness –
The Freethinker –
The Gambler –
The Garden of Cyrus –
The Garden Party –
The Gay Science –
The General Idea of the Revolution in the Nineteenth Century –
The Geography of Thought –
The German Ideology –
The Ghost in the Machine –
The Ghost-Seer –
The Global Trap –
The God Delusion –
The Good Book –
The Grammar of Science –
The Grand Inquisitor –
The Growing Stone –
The Guest –
The Guide for the Perplexed –
The Guide –
The Handmaid's Tale –
The Harvard Review of Philosophy –
The Herald of Coming Good –
The Hermetic Tradition –
The Hero with a Thousand Faces –
The History of England –
The History of Great Britain –
The History of Sexuality –
The Human Condition –
The Idiot –
The Imaginary –
The Inclusion of the Other –
The Incoherence of the Incoherence –
The Incoherence of the Philosophers –
The Informant –
The International Library of Psychology, Philosophy and Scientific Method –
The Invisible Hook –
The Journal of Aesthetics and Art Criticism –
The Journal of Ayn Rand Studies –
The Journal of Ethics –
The Journal of Nietzsche Studies –
The Journal of Philosophy –
The Just Assassins –
The Kal m Cosmological Argument –
The Kingdom of this World –
The Last Messiah –
The Last Puritan –
The Lathe of Heaven –
The Law –
The Law of Nations –
The Law of Peoples –
The Laws of Thought –
The Legitimation of Power –
The Life of Reason –
The Life You Can Save –
The Literature of Exhaustion –
The Logic of Scientific Discovery –
The Logic of Sense –
The Lonergan Review –
The Machiavellian Moment –
The Machinery of Freedom –
The Magic Mountain –
The Maid of Orleans –
The Man Without Qualities –
The Market for Liberty –
The Marriage of Heaven and Hell –
The Master and His Emissary –
The Master of Go –
The Meaning of Meaning –
The Meaning of Things –
The Mechanism of the Mind –
The Mentor Philosophers –
The Metamorphosis –
The Metaphysical Club: A Story of Ideas in America –
The Methods of Ethics –
The Middle Way –
The Mind's I –
The Miracle of Mindfulness –
The Misunderstanding –
The Modern Schoolman –
The Monist –
The Moral Landscape –
The Moviegoer –
The Mystery of Banking –
The Mystery of Being –
The Mystery of the Grail –
The Myth of Sisyphus –
The Myth of the Rational Voter –
The Name of the Rose –
The Natural History of Revolution –
The Nature and Destiny of Man –
The Nature of Mind –
The Nature of Rationality –
The Nature of Truth –
The Necessity of Atheism –
The Nemesis of Faith –
The New Masses –
The New Science –
The Only Possible Argument in Support of a Demonstration of the Existence of God –
The Open Society and Its Enemies –
The Ordeal of Richard Feverel –
The Order of Things –
The Origin of German Tragic Drama –
The Origin of the Family, Private Property and the State –
The Origin of the Work of Art –
The Origins of Virtue –
The Outdatedness of Human Beings –
The Owl of Minerva –
The Oxford Companion to Philosophy –
The Oxford Dictionary of Philosophy –
The Panic of 1819 –
The Paradoxes of the Infinite –
The Penultimate Truth –
The Perennial Philosophy –
The Phenomenology of Spirit –
The Phenomenon of Man –
The Philosopher –
The Philosophers' Magazine –
The Philosophic Thought of Ayn Rand –
The Philosophical Discourse of Modernity –
The Philosophical Forum –
The Philosophical Lexicon –
The Philosophical Quarterly –
The Philosophical Review –
The Philosophy of Friedrich Nietzsche –
The Philosophy of Money –
The Pigeon –
The Plague –
The Point of View of My Work as an Author –
The Politics of Individualism –
The Portage to San Cristobal of A.H. –
The Possessed –
The Postmodern Condition –
The Postnational Constellation –
The Poverty of Historicism –
The Poverty of Philosophy –
The Praise of Folly –
The Prince –
The Principal Upanishads –
The Principles of Mathematics –
The Problem of Pain –
The Problems of Philosophy –
The Question Concerning Technology –
The Racial Contract –
The Rage Against God –
The Range of Reason –
The Rape of the A*P*E* –
The Rationalists –
The Raw Youth –
The Realms of Being –
The Reason of State –
The Rebel –
The Reconstruction of Religious Thought in Islam –
The Relativity of Wrong –
The Religion of Man –
The Renegade –
The Reprieve –
The Republic –
The Respectful Prostitute –
The Rhetoric of Drugs –
The Right and the Good -
The Right Attitude to Rain –
The Road to Serfdom –
The Roads to Freedom –
The Robbers –
The Rod of Moses –
The Roman Revolution –
The Romantic Manifesto –
The Roots of Reference –
The Royal Way –
The Rutherford Journal –
The Sacrament of the Body and Blood of Christ—Against the Fanatics –
The Satanic Bible –
The School for Atheists –
The Science of Good and Evil –
The Sea, the Sea –
The Second Sex –
The Secret of Hegel –
The Secrets of Selflessness –
The Secrets of the Self –
The Selfish Genius –
The Shockwave Rider –
The Sickness Unto Death –
The Silent Men –
The Silent World of Doctor and Patient –
The Simpsons and Philosophy: The D'oh! of Homer –
The Situations and Names of Winds –
The Skeptic's Dictionary –
The Sky Crawlers –
The Sleepwalkers –
The Social Contract –
The Society of the Spectacle –
The Solar Anus –
The Solitaire Mystery –
The Soul of Man under Socialism –
The Spirit of Democratic Capitalism –
The Spirit of the Laws –
The State –
The State and Revolution –
The State of Siege –
The Story of My Heart –
The Story of Philosophy –
The Stranger –
The Structural Transformation of the Public Sphere –
The Structure of Liberty –
The Structure of Scientific Revolutions –
The Subjection of Women –
The Sublime Object of Ideology –
The Sunday Philosophy Club –
The Sunlight Dialogues –
The Symbolic Species –
The System of Economic Contradictions, or The Philosophy of Poverty –
The System of Nature –
The Tao of Zen –
The Task –
The Tea Party Goes to Washington –
The Teachers of Gurdjieff –
The Teachings of the Mystics –
The Theatre considered as a Moral Institution –
The Theory and Practice of Oligarchical Collectivism –
The Theory of Communicative Action –
The Theory of Moral Sentiments –
The Theory of Social and Economic Organization –
The Thief's Journal –
The Third Policeman –
The Threat to Reason –
The Three Types of Legitimate Rule –
The Transcendence of the Ego –
The Trial –
The True Law of Free Monarchies –
The Twilight of Atheism –
The Unbearable Lightness of Being –
The Unreality of Time –
The Urantia Book –
The Use of Knowledge in Society –
The Value of Science –
The Varieties of Religious Experience –
The Virtue of Selfishness –
The Vision of the Anointed –
The Vocation of Man –
The Voice of Reason –
The Voluntary City –
The Wall –
The Way of Peace –
The Wealth of Nations –
The Will to Power –
The Words –
The Work of Art in the Age of Mechanical Reproduction –
The World –
The World as Will and Representation –
The World of Null-A –
The Yogi and the Commissar –
Theaetetus –
Theages –
Themes in Blade Runner –
Théodicée –
Theodor W. Adorno bibliography –
Theologico-Political Treatise –
Theophrastus redivivus –
Theoria –
Theory and Decision –
Theory and Event –
Thérèse Philosophe –
Theses on Feuerbach –
Think –
Think: A Compelling Introduction to Philosophy –
Thinker's Library –
Thinking about Consciousness –
Thirteen Classics –
Thoughts on Government –
Thoughts on Machiavelli –
Thoughts on the True Estimation of Living Forces –
Three Critics of the Enlightenment –
Three Dialogues between Hylas and Philonous –
Three Principles of the People –
Three Upbuilding Discourses, 1844 –
Three Upbuilding Discourses –
Thus Spoke Zarathustra –
Timaeus –
Time and Free Will –
Tiqqun –
To Have or to Be? –
Tomer Devorah –
Topics –
Totality and Infinity –
Tractatus de Intellectus Emendatione –
Tractatus Logico-Philosophicus –
Tractatus Politicus –
Tractatus Theologico-Politicus –
Treatise –
Troubled Sleep –
Truth and Method –
Tuesdays with Morrie –
Tulu'i Islam –
Turkish Review –
Tusculanae Disputationes –
Tusculanae Quaestiones –
Twelfth Letter –
Twilight of the Idols –
Two Ages: A Literary Review –
Two Concepts of Liberty –
Two Dogmas of Empiricism –
Two Treatises of Government –
Two Upbuilding Discourses, 1843 –
Two Upbuilding Discourses, 1844 –

U 
Ubik –
Umberto Eco bibliography –
Under the Net –
Understanding Consciousness –
Undoing Gender –
Universal Natural History and Theory of Heaven –
Untimely Meditations –
Untimely Meditations –
Utilitarianism –
Utilitas –
Utopia –

V 
VALIS –
Verbal Behavior –
Verbal Behavior –
Verbum Supernum Prodiens –
Views from the Real World –
Visions of Order –
Vita Brevis –

W 
Waiting for Godot –
Waking Life –
Walden –
Wallenstein –
War and Peace –
War in the Age of Intelligent Machines –
War of Anti-Christ with the Church and Christian Civilization –
Waterland –
We Can Build You –
We Can Remember It for You Wholesale –
We the Living –
Wen-tzu –
Wenzi –
What Computers Can't Do –
What Has Government Done to Our Money? –
What I Believe –
What Is Art? –
What Is it Like to Be a Bat? –
What Is Literature? –
What Is Property? –
What Is This Thing Called Science? –
What is universal history and why does one study it? –
What should then be done O people of the East –
What We Believe But Cannot Prove –
When Nietzsche Wept –
Where Late the Sweet Birds Sang –
Wholeness and the Implicate Order –
Whose Justice? Which Rationality? –
Why I Am Not a Christian –
Why Truth Matters –
William Tell –
Wirtembergisches Repertorium der Literatur –
Wittgenstein on Rules and Private Language –
Wittgenstein's Beetle and Other Classic Thought Experiments –
Wittgenstein's Mistress –
Wittgenstein's Poker –
Word and Object –
Works by Thomas Aquinas –
Works of Love –
World Hypotheses –
Writing and Difference –
Writing Sampler –
Wuzhen pian –

X-Z 
Xenien –
Xueren –
Youth –
Zadig –
Zarathustra's roundelay –
Zeitschrift für Kulturphilosophie –
Zen and the Art of Motorcycle Maintenance –
Zettel –
Zhizn –
Zhuangzi –
Zorba the Greek –

Literature
 
Lists of books